Agassiziella irisalis is a moth in the family Crambidae. It is found in the Democratic Republic of Congo and Sierra Leone.

References

Acentropinae
Moths of Africa
Moths described in 1859